In enzymology, a Delta24-sterol reductase is an enzyme that catalyzes the chemical reaction

5alpha-cholest-7-en-3beta-ol + NADP+  5alpha-cholesta-7,24-dien-3beta-ol + NADPH + H+

Thus, the two substrates of this enzyme are 5alpha-cholest-7-en-3beta-ol and NADP+, whereas its 3 products are 5alpha-cholesta-7,24-dien-3beta-ol, NADPH, and H+.

This enzyme belongs to the family of oxidoreductases, specifically those acting on the CH-CH group of donor with NAD+ or NADP+ as acceptor.  The systematic name of this enzyme class is sterol:NADP+ Delta24-oxidoreductase. This enzyme is also called lanosterol Delta24-reductase.  This enzyme participates in biosynthesis of steroids.

References

 

EC 1.3.1
NADPH-dependent enzymes
Enzymes of unknown structure